Mukhtar. The New Trace (Russian: Мухтар. Новый след, in 2004–2015 is Muhtar's Return, Russian: Возвращение Мухтара) is a Russian detective, crime, serial film, a film about the adventures of investigators, police officers, police and search dog. Production Company "Kit Media" on request of "Studio 2V". Series premiere was held on 12 January 2004 from the RTR, and August 31, 2004, the project was on the NTV.

Plot 
The heroes of serial movie work in the police department (and since season 8 in the police) and investigate various crimes ranging from petty theft to serious disappearances, kidnappings and killings. The uniqueness of the team is that, together with operatives serves Mukhtar is a brave and loyal dog who helps to reveal the tangled affairs thanks to his unique scent and ingenuity.

Cast
 Alexander Nosik as Artyom Kolosov (1-2 seasons)
 Alla Kovnir as  Elena   Brusnikina (1-4 seasons)
 Alexander Volkov as  Maxim Zharov  (3-4 seasons)
 Viktor Nizovoy as Anatoly Schepkin   (1-4 seasons)
  Natalia Yunnikova as  Vasilisa Mikhailova (4-8 seasons, 9 season 26 episode)
 Pavel Vishnyakov as Maxim Zharov  Andreevich (5-6, 9–10 seasons)
 Alexey Shutov as Maxim Zharov    (7-8 seasons)
 Vladimir Feklenko as Maxim Zharov   (11-12 seasons)
 Alexey Moiseev as Alexey Samoilov (3-11 seasons)
 Alexander Voevodin as  Nikolay Nikolayevich Khrulev (1-12 seasons)
 Svetlana Brjukhanova as Ekaterina Kalitina (9-12 seasons)
 Nadezhda Antsipovich as  Nadezhda Kostrova (10-12 seasons)
 Artyom Osipov as Ivan Davidov (12 season)
 Sergey Gromov as Roshchin Evgeny Aleksandrovich (12 season)
 Daniil Doroshenko as Ershov Ivan (9-10 seasons)
 Valery Astakhov as Dyatlo Viktor Petrovich (3-10 seasons)

List of episodes 
The series is conditionally divided into seasons 10.

The series soundtracks 
Come Here, Mukhtar! (Russian: Ко мне, Мухтар!) that sounds in the series, was originally performed by  Alexander Kosenkov, and starting from the season 2, this song was sung by Vladimir Zlatoustovsky, director of the film. Lyrics were written by songwriter Yevgeny Muravyov. Music by Alexander Kosenkov.

Production 
The season 1 was filmed in Moscow. Since the season 2 episodes filmed in Kyiv involving local actors in secondary roles. Most episodes filmed in Kyiv right bank Nyvky region. In particular, the facade of the police building located there filmed as the entrance of the Russian police, where the main characters serves. In 2014—2015 began filming the TV series in Minsk.

On 28 May 2016 filming of the TV series continued, but under a new name, Mukhtar. The New Trace.

Awards 
Creative team of the show, including actors, writers and directors, twice (2007 and 2009) awarded diplomas and medals of the Ministry of Internal Affairs "for creating a professional image of criminal investigator and propaganda service dog Russia".

In 2009 the Mukhtar's Return 2 episode was awarded with special prize at the International Festival of Detective Films DetectiveFEST. In 2015 It  took part in "TEFI-2015" and received a main prize in the nomination "Telenovela", surpassing "The Last Yanychar" (Russia-1) and «From the Heavens to the Earth» (TV center).

See also 
 Kommissar Rex

References

External links
 
 Episodes of the Season 9 and others (NTV channel) (Russian)

NTV (Russia) original programming
Russia-1 original programming
2004 Russian television series debuts
Russian crime television series
2000s Russian television series
2010s Russian television series
Television shows about dogs